Emil Milev (born 2 May 1968) is a former Bulgarian sport shooter, and currently a sport shooter for the United States, who competed in the 1992 Summer Olympics, in the 1996 Summer Olympics, in the 2000 Summer Olympics, and in the 2004 Summer Olympics.  At the 2012 Summer Olympics he, competed for the US, finishing in 13th place.

By qualifying for the 2016 Rio Olympics in the 25m Rapid Fire Pistol men’s event, Milev became the second U.S. Olympic shooter ever to qualify for six games.

In September 2017, Milev was hired as the head coach for The Ohio State University Pistol Team.

Competition History
 2016 Olympian, USA, 25M Rapid Fire Pistol
 2015 Pistol Selection, Silver Medalist
 2015 Spring Selection, Silver Medalist
 2014 World Cup Finals, Fourth Place
 2013 World Cup Finals, Gold Medalist
 2013 World Cup Granada, Bronze Medalist
 2013 National Championship, Gold Medalist
 2012 Olympic Games, 13th Place
 2012 World Cup Milan, 4th Place
 2011 Pan American Games, Gold Medalist
 2011 World Cup Final Wroclaw, 5th Place
 2011 World Cup Munich, Bronze Medalist
 2011 World Cup Sydney, 8th Place
 2011 National Championship, Gold Medalist
 2010 Championships of the Americas, Silver Medalist
 2005 World Cup Fort Benning, Gold Medalist
 2004 Olympic Games Athens, 8th Place
 2003 European Championship Plzen, Silver Medalist
 2003 World Cup Final Milan, Bronze Medalist
 2003 World Cup Munich, Silver Medalist
 2002 World Cup Sydney, Gold Medalist
 2002 World Cup Shanghai, Gold Medalist
 2001 World Cup Atlanta, Silver Medalist
 2001 World Cup Final Munich, Bronze Medalist
 2000 Olympic Games Sydney, 4th Place
 1997 World Cup Havana, Gold Medalist
 1996 World Cup Havana, Gold Medalist
 1996 Olympic Games Atlanta, Silver Medalist
 1995 World Cup Final Munich, Silver Medalist
 1994 World Championship Milan, Silver Medalist

References

1964 births
Living people
Bulgarian male sport shooters
American male sport shooters
ISSF pistol shooters
Olympic shooters of Bulgaria
Olympic shooters of the United States
Shooters at the 1992 Summer Olympics
Shooters at the 1996 Summer Olympics
Shooters at the 2000 Summer Olympics
Shooters at the 2004 Summer Olympics
Shooters at the 2012 Summer Olympics
Shooters at the 2016 Summer Olympics
Olympic silver medalists for Bulgaria
Olympic medalists in shooting
Medalists at the 1996 Summer Olympics
Pan American Games medalists in shooting
Pan American Games gold medalists for the United States
Shooters at the 2015 Pan American Games